The modern pentathlon at the 1988 Summer Olympics was represented by two events (both for men): Individual competition and Team competition. It was fought in five days on September 18 to 22, and individual results were also directly applied towards the team event ranking.

Medal summary

Participating nations
A total of 65 athletes from 26 nations competed at the Seoul Games:

Final Results

Individual

Team

References

External links
Official Olympic Report

 
1988 Summer Olympics events